Chelles may refer to:
Chelles, Oise, a commune in the Oise département, France
Chelles, Seine-et-Marne, a commune in the Seine-et-Marne département, 18 km east of Paris
Chelles Abbey, located in the commune until its destruction in 1796
 Chelles Battle Pro, an annual b-boying competition held in Chelles, Seine-et-Marne
 Jean de Chelles, master mason and sculptor
 Pierre de Chelles, 14th-century French architect and sculptor